Mulegns is a village and a former municipality in the Sursés  in the district of Albula in the canton of Graubünden in Switzerland. On 1 January 2016 the former municipalities of Bivio, Cunter, Marmorera, Mulegns, Riom-Parsonz, Salouf, Savognin, Sur and Tinizong-Rona merged to form the new municipality of Surses.

History
Around 600-500 BC, a copper mine and smelter were built in the Val Faller (Faller valley) near modern Mulegns.  The village was founded by a Walser group during the 15th Century.  It was first mentioned in 1521.

Geography

Of this area, 30.1% is used for agricultural purposes, while 9.8% is forested. Of the rest of the land, 0.4% is settled (buildings or roads) and the remainder (59.6%) is non-productive (rivers, glaciers or mountains).

The former municipality is located in the Surses sub-district of the Albula district.  It is along the road to the Julier Pass (the Julienstrasse) at the entrance to a side valley of the Val Faller.  Until 1943 Mulegns was known as Mühlen.

Demographics
Mulegns had a population (as of 2014) of 25.  Over the last 10 years the population has decreased at a rate of -23.5%.

, the gender distribution of the population was 50.0% male and 50.0% female.  The age distribution, in Mulegns is; 3 people or 9.1% of the population are between 0 and 9 years old.  1 person or 3.0% is 10 to 14, and 2 people or 6.1% are 15 to 19.  Of the adult population, no one is between 20 and 29 years old.  6 people or 18.2% are 30 to 39, 1 person or 3.0% is 40 to 49, and 5 people or 15.2% are 50 to 59.  The senior population distribution is 8 people or 24.2% of the population are between 60 and 69 years old, 6 people or 18.2% are 70 to 79, there is 1 person or 3.0% who is 80 to 89.

In the 2007 federal election the most popular party was the CVP which received 63.3% of the vote.  The next two most popular parties were the SVP (20%) and the FDP (8.3%).

In Mulegns about 62.5% of the population (between age 25–64) have completed either non-mandatory upper secondary education or additional higher education (either university or a Fachhochschule).

Mulegns has an unemployment rate of 1.56%.  , there were 12 people employed in the primary economic sector and about 5 businesses involved in this sector.   people are employed in the secondary sector and there are  businesses in this sector.  1 people are employed in the tertiary sector, with 1 businesses in this sector.

The historical population is given in the following table:

Languages
Most of the population speaks Rhaeto-Romance (57.6%), with the rest speaking German(42.4%).

References

External links
 

Surses
Former municipalities of Graubünden